Gerald Bacher (born 8 October 1968) is a retired Austrian football midfielder.

References

1968 births
Living people
Austrian footballers
FC Admira Wacker Mödling players
FC Linz players
Iraklis Thessaloniki F.C. players
SV Spittal players
BSV Bad Bleiberg players
Association football midfielders
Austrian expatriate footballers
Expatriate footballers in Greece
Austrian expatriate sportspeople in Greece
Austrian Football Bundesliga players